The 2014–15 Montana Lady Griz basketball team represents the University of Montana during the 2014–15 NCAA Division I women's basketball season. The Lady Griz, led by thirty-seventh year head coach Robin Selvig, play their home games at Dahlberg Arena and were members of the Big Sky Conference. They finish the season 24–9, 14–4 in Big Sky play to win the Big Sky Regular Season Championship. They were also champions of the 2015 Big Sky Conference women's basketball tournament and earn an automatic trip to the 2015 NCAA Division I women's basketball tournament where they lost to Notre Dame in the first round.

Roster

Schedule
Source 

|-
!colspan=9 style="background:#660033; color:#999999;"| Exhibition

|-
!colspan=9 style="background:#660033; color:#999999;"| Regular Season

|-
!colspan=9 style="background:#660033; color:#848482;"| Big Sky Women's Tournament

|-
!colspan=9 style="background:#660033; color:#848482;"| NCAA Women's Tournament

See also
2014–15 Montana Grizzlies basketball team

References

Montana Lady Griz basketball seasons
Montana
Montana
Lady
Lady